Taohong is a town and the seat of Longhui County in Hunan, China. The town was established in 1942 and reorganized through the amalgamation of Shimen Township, Yushanpu Town and the former Taohong Town on November 24, 2015. 

It is located in the middle part of southern Longhui County, the town is bordered by Hexiangqiao Town and Tantou Town to the north, by Zhouwang Town to the west, by Beishan Town, Shanjie Township and Sangesi Town to the south, by Nanyuemiao Town to the west. Through the merging villages and communities in 2016, its subdivisions were reduced to 76 from 139.  it has 60 villages and 16 residential communities under its jurisdiction. Its seat is Xinlong Community.

Administrative divisions

References

Longhui County
County seats in Hunan